Konstantinoupoleos Avenue is named after Constantinople, the capital of the Byzantine Empire, and is an avenue in the western suburbs of Athens. It links the western part of Agios Ioannis Rentis near Piraeus to the northern part of Sepolia, which links with a road to Kamatero.  The western part has several lanes and the eastern part is a city street, while the rest of the route is a major road that is used as access to Kallirois Street which links with Vouliagmenis Avenue as well as Vasileos Konstantinou Avenue, thus linking the western suburbs of Athens to the southern ones, bypassing the downtown section.

History
Construction began on an underpass when traffic increased on Lenorman Avenue in the mid-20th century.  Later in the mid to late 20th century, construction began on an overpass with Petrou Ralli Avenue and a junction in the northwestern section.  In 1992, a part of the avenue shut down detouring Athinon Avenue (GR-8 and GR-8A, E94 westbound) and redirected the traffic through Palamidou Street and the southern half of Lenorman Avenue.  It lasted for about a year when an overpass was built with an Athens-bound exit and a westbound entrance and the road was finally re-opened. Between 1993 and 1994, construction began at Konstantinoupoleos and another avenue linking with Kallirois Street and an interchange with Pireos Street.  It removed the railway crossing and an underpass about 500 m long. The northern part ran through the railway crossings while the avenue link runs below.

Streets in Athens